Edward Blake Archibald (March 29, 1884 – March 20, 1965) was a Canadian athlete who competed mainly in the pole vault. He was born and died in Toronto.

He competed for Canada in the 1908 Summer Olympics held in London, Great Britain in the pole vault where he won the Bronze medal jointly with American Clare Jacobs and Swede Bruno Söderström.

Archibald started a summer camp for boys near Sudbury, and then it was moved around 1930 to the Temagemi area.

References

External links
Canadian Medals by Olympic Games at TSN.ca

1884 births
1965 deaths
Athletes from Toronto
Athletes (track and field) at the 1908 Summer Olympics
Olympic bronze medalists for Canada
Olympic track and field athletes of Canada
Canadian male pole vaulters
Medalists at the 1908 Summer Olympics
Olympic bronze medalists in athletics (track and field)
20th-century Canadian people